Western Reserve Academy (WRA), or simply Reserve, is a private, midsized, coeducational boarding and day college preparatory school located in Hudson, Ohio, United States. A boarding school, Western Reserve Academy is largely a residential campus, with 280 of 390 students living on campus and the remainder attending as day students. Students attend from over 20 states and 15 countries

History

Western Reserve Academy was established on February 7, 1826, as the Western Reserve College and Preparatory School in Hudson, Ohio, on a  plot of land set aside by charter by the Ohio legislature. Reserve is the 27th oldest preparatory boarding school in the United States, and the oldest outside of the Northeast.

The institution's name comes from the area in which it was built, the Connecticut Western Reserve, as it was the first of its kind in Northern Ohio. The settlers from Connecticut wanted to build a school of the same caliber as Yale College and selected the same architectural design, with brick buildings and the same motto, Lux Et Veritas. People called it "the Yale of the West." The first cohort included eleven students at the college level and eight at the preparatory level. In 1882, the college section moved north to Cleveland and became Western Reserve University, later merging with the Case Institute of Technology to become Case Western Reserve University. Western Reserve Academy remained open for another twenty-one years until 1903 when it closed due to financial problems.

In 1916, however, the school reopened with the support of James Ellsworth, a former student and Hudson resident who had returned after becoming wealthy in the coal industry. The "Ellsworth Era" was marked by significant construction: Seymour Hall (the newly appointed academic building), the Bicknell Gymnasium, and Ellsworth Hall, a dormitory and dining hall. In 1922, Western Reserve Academy became an all-boys institution, staying this way for fifty years, until 1972, when girls were introduced into the junior class, once again becoming a co-ed institution.

In 2001, Western Reserve Academy was recognized by U.S. News & World Report as one of the top boarding schools in the country.

Extracurricular activities

Athletics
The school offers various sports, including soccer, golf, cross country, field hockey, volleyball, swimming and diving, basketball, wrestling, riflery, ice hockey, baseball, softball, track and field, tennis, and lacrosse.

Western Reserve Academy has become one of the top high school lacrosse teams in the United States. In 2006 and 2009, WRA won the Midwest Scholastic Lacrosse Championship and respectively finished ranked 27th and 28th nationally according to LaxPower.com. Only three different teams have won the Midwest Championships since 1992: Brother Rice High School, Western Reserve Academy, and Upper Arlington High School. Inside Lacrosse ranked the 2009 WRA lacrosse team number one in the Midwest.

The track and cross-country teams achieved success from the 1940s through the 1980s, winning many Interstate League championships, with the cross-country team at one time boasting a streak of 179–1. The WRA track is named after track and cross country coach Frank Longstreth and hosts the annual Frank Longstreth Relays.

In 2012, both the girls' and boys' soccer teams achieved a state ranking, with the boys experiencing an undefeated season and the girls' teams, both JV and varsity, breaking the record for most wins in a season. The boys tied top Ohio Division I team St. Ignatius High School and finishing the year atop the Ohio Division III rankings.

Traditionally, a rivalry with University School has existed, having first played each other in 1895. Other notable rivalries include The Kiski School, Linsly School, and Hawken School.

Arts
Reserve offers over 20 different classes catering to students interested in the arts. Courses are available through the school's music, dance, theater, and visual arts programs. Both 2D and 3D art rooms are available at all times to students, and a Graphic Design computer lab and a workshop for Woodworking. Most fine arts occur in the Knight Fine Arts Center (KFAC), with the music program headquartered in Hayden Hall. KFAC contains several classrooms, a theater, a dance studio, and a dark room for film development. The Moos Gallery, also in KFAC, features students' work and exhibits from established and nationally recognized artists.

Traditions
Western Reserve Academy has several traditions. One of the most popular is Vespers, a Christmas Concert and sit-down meal right before students leave for winter break. Another is TGIF—a study break each Friday where much of the student body descends into "The Green Key", a lounge beneath the dining hall, to snack, dance, and socialize before the weekend. Like TGIF, some traditions are weekly. For instance, the entire faculty and student body have a sit-down lunch each Wednesday. The meal is served family-style, and students sit with their academic advisors in an intimate setting. Another frequent tradition is the victory bell. Almost lost after the construction of the Murdough Athletic Center, this tradition was rekindled when the bell was reinstalled in 2012. After each Reserve athletic victory, the players on the winning team take turns ringing the bell loud enough for the entire campus to hear. Reserve students also participate in several artistic and musical traditions, including the annual "Messiah Sing" concert. The Academy String Orchestra and Academy Choir perform Handel's Messiah and invite the audience to join in for many songs.

Finally, the last tradition Reserve students experience, Commencement, is set just outside the historic chapel. The graduating men wear Reserve green and white pants while the women wear white dresses. They are led through campus by bagpipers and followed by the faculty. As each student is called up, they receive their diploma and the alum tie (for men) or pin (for women).

Dress code
Western Reserve Academy enforces a strict dress code daily. Boys must wear a coat and tie all week, with special "Reserve Green" (consisting of a green jacket with the Academy crest and a green striped tie) mandatory on Monday and Friday. Likewise, girls on "Reserve Green" days must wear a green blazer and a green kilt. At Saturday Academy, the dress is relaxed.

Campus

Chapel and Loomis Observatory
Western Reserve's campus houses many old buildings. However, two, in particular, stand out: the Loomis Observatory and the chapel, both listed in the National Register of Historic Places. Initially built in 1836 and most recently updated in 2021, the chapel is still used today for Morning meetings twice weekly. In addition, marriages, concerts, and gatherings take place inside the chapel. The Commencement ceremony at the end of the year takes place outside the chapel. Even though the school itself is nondenominational, the chapel has a cross hanging front and center, which used to hang in the Spanish monastery Santa Maria de La Rabida (La Rábida Friary). It is said that before Christopher Columbus voyaged to the New World, he prayed before that very cross.

The Loomis Observatory, initially named The Observatory, was built in 1838. It was the third observatory built in the country, and is currently the second oldest observatory in the United States, only behind the Hopkins Observatory at Williams College. The Hudson building was named for astronomer Elias Loomis. This three-room observatory still stands, sitting close to the edge of the campus near the music building, Hayden Hall. The building itself is closed from public view, as well as the telescope housed in the observatory, which is no longer used (in favor of a newer and more secluded observatory on Cross Country Hill).

Ong Library
Named after Ambassador John D. Ong, the Ong Library is a 21,000 sq ft. building located on the south end of campus. It contains nearly 23,000 books, 3,000 DVDs and CDs, and 110 periodicals. Open to students all day through study hours, the library features two computer labs and a dozen group study rooms. The basement also contains the Western Reserve Academy Archives Collection, which follows the 200-year-old school and town history.

Dormitories

There are ten dormitories in which the over 200 boarding students reside during the school year. The oldest is North Hall, erected in 1838, and the newest is Bicknell House. Each dorm houses students in a single, double, triple, or quad, with shared bathrooms.

Each dorm has both a House Master as well as other Faculty-Masters living in connected apartments. Approximately 90% of the faculty members reside on campus in either faculty homes or dormitory apartments.

Notable alumni
Individuals with a † next to their name were enrolled in either or both institutions before Western Reserve College moved from the Hudson campus to Cleveland in 1882 and became Western Reserve University. The degree to which they were affiliated with both institutions may vary. Individuals with a * next to their name did not complete their studies.

Politics, government and law

Literature and journalism

Arts and entertainment
D.M. Marshman, Jr. '41 — Academy Award-winning screenplay writer for Sunset Boulevard.
Frederick Coffin '61 — Film and television actor
Jeff Schaffer '87 — Film director, TV show writer (Seinfeld, Curb Your Enthusiasm, The League)
Richard Brake '83 — Film actor (Batman Begins)
Macy Gray* '84 — Grammy Award-winning musician/singer
Ted Humphrey '87 — Emmy Award-nominated television and film writer and producer

Business
James Ellsworth† 1868 — Coal mine owner, banker
James L. Knight '29 — Newspaperman and philanthropist, founder of Knight Ridder newspaper group
William D. Perez '65 — CEO of Wm. Wrigley Jr. Company, former CEO of Nike, Inc.

Sports
Keith Carter '48 — Olympic swimmer; silver medalist at 1948 Summer Olympic Games
Joel Dalgarno '05 — Professional lacrosse player for the Colorado Mammoth; all-time scoring leader for Ohio State Buckeyes

Miscellaneous

Notable faculty
 Beriah Green, taught at Western Reserve College and Prefatory Academy
 Edward Morley, taught at Western Reserve College and Prefatory Academy
  Joseph Frederick Waring, taught at Western Reserve Academy for 32 years; had an award named in his honor

References

External links

 
 The Association of Boarding Schools profile

Boarding schools in Ohio
High schools in Summit County, Ohio
National Register of Historic Places in Summit County, Ohio
Preparatory schools in Ohio
Educational institutions established in 1826
School buildings on the National Register of Historic Places in Ohio
Historic districts on the National Register of Historic Places in Ohio
Private high schools in Ohio
1826 establishments in Ohio
Case Western Reserve University
Hudson, Ohio
Western Reserve, Ohio